Sivica is a village in Međimurje County, Croatia.

The village is part of the Podturen municipality and had a population of 681 in the 2011 census. It is located around 9 kilometres from the centre of Čakovec, the county seat of Međimurje County. The main road going through the village connects Čakovec with Podturen, which is located around 4 kilometres from Sivica. 

The village is mainly surrounded by agricultural fields and some forests. The closest villages to Sivica include Celine, Gornji Kraljevec and Novo Selo Rok.

References

Populated places in Međimurje County